This is a list of airports in Oman, grouped by type and sorted by location.



Airports 

Airport names shown in bold indicate the airport has scheduled service on commercial airlines.

See also 
 Transport in Oman
 List of airports by ICAO code: O#OO - Oman
 Wikipedia:WikiProject Aviation/Airline destination lists: Asia#Oman

References 
 
  - includes IATA codes
 Great Circle Mapper: Airports in Oman - IATA and ICAO codes
 World Aero Data: Airports in Oman - ICAO codes

Oman
 
Airports
Airports
Oman